Manasa Varanasi is an Indian model, engineer and beauty pageant title holder who was crowned Femina Miss India 2020. She represented India at the Miss World 2021 pageant in San Juan, Puerto Rico.

Early life and education
Manasa Varanasi was born in Hyderabad to Ravi Sankar and Shailaja. She moved to Malaysia at a young age due to her father's work and was schooled at Global Indian International School and completed her grade 10 there. Later she returned to India, completed her intermediate then studied computer science at Vasavi College of Engineering Hyderabad. After completing her education and graduating with a computer science degree, she started to work as a Financial Information eXchange (FIX) analyst at Factset, Hyderabad. She won the Miss Fresher title in the first year of her college.

Pageantry
In 2020, she entered Femina Miss India 2020 and eventually won. She represented the state of Telangana at the Femina Miss India 2020 pageant. On 10 February 2021, she was crowned as Femina Miss India World 2020 by the outgoing titleholder Miss World 2019 2nd Runner-Up and Miss World Asia Suman Rao at Hyatt Regency, Mumbai. During the pageant's sub contest ceremony, she won the 'Miss Rampwalk' award.
She represented India at the 70th edition of the Miss World 2021 pageant, held on 16 March 2022 at Coca-Cola Music Hall, San Juan, Puerto Rico. She was regarded as one of the strongest contenders for the Miss World 2021 Crown.

Advocacy
Varanasi advocates to strengthen child protection laws in India for her Beauty with a purpose project. She also flagged off "We Can" a first-of-it's-kind awareness campaign against sexual abuse of children. The change she'd like to bring about mostly has to do with access to quality education for children, that helps fuel youth, by giving them access to education and a chance to dream big.

References

External links

Femina Miss India winners
Indian beauty pageant winners
Living people
1997 births
Miss World 2021 delegates
Female models from Hyderabad, India